The FINA Men's Water Polo World Cup is an international water polo tournament, organized by FINA and featuring eight men's national teams. It was established in 1979, initially taking place on odd years. Since 2002 it is held every four years, in the even-year between Olympics.

From 2023 on, the tournament will be replacing the FINA Water Polo World League.

Editions

Medal table

Source:

Participation details
Legend

  – Champions
  – Runners-up
  – Third place
  – Fourth place
  – Disqualified
  – Hosts
 = – More than one team tied for that rank
 Q – Qualified for forthcoming tournament
 † – Defunct team

See also
 FINA Women's Water Polo World Cup
 List of water polo world medalists
 Major achievements in water polo by nation

References

 
Water polo
Cup
World cups